Beyond the Chocolate War is the sequel to the award-winning book The Chocolate War by Robert Cormier. The sequel received an Honor List citation from the Horn Book Magazine in 1986.

New characters 

A few new characters are added to the plot here in Beyond the Chocolate War:

Ray Bannister -  A new transfer student at Trinity who takes an interest in magic tricks. Obie originally intended to simply give him an "assignment" from The Vigils but later develops a genuine friendship with him. Later, Obie plans to use Ray to get revenge on Archie.
Laurie Gundarson - Another student who is Obie's girlfriend but Bunting ruins their relationship by almost raping her in a parking lot.
Bunting - New member of The Vigils who looks up to Archie and aspires to succeed him as Assigner. Eventually goes as far as trying to rape Obie's girlfriend Laurie Gundarson to prove his loyalty to Archie.
Cornacchio - New member of The Vigils.  Follows orders from Bunting.
Harley - New member of The Vigils.  Follows orders from Bunting.
The Bishop -  Planned to give a speech at Trinity but cancelled. The Vigils planned a prank of no one attending the speech, which would have happened if the Bishop had not cancelled.

References

1985 American novels
Novels by Robert Cormier
American young adult novels
Alfred A. Knopf books
Novels set in high schools and secondary schools
Sequel novels
1985 children's books